Brielle Draw is a railroad bascule bridge over Manasquan River in Brielle and Point Pleasant Beach, Monmouth County, New Jersey, United States west of the Manasquan Inlet to the Atlantic Ocean. It carries a single track of the New Jersey Transit Rail Operations (NJT) North Jersey Coast Line (MP 36.38) between
Manasquan and Point Pleasant Beach stations. It had once been part of Central Railroad of New Jersey (CNJ), New York & Long Branch Railroad (NYLB) and Pennsylvania Railroad (PRR) operations. The line is also served by the River Draw over the Raritan River, the Morgan Draw over Cheesequake Creek, the Oceanport Draw over Oceanport Creek and the Shark River Draw.

See also
NJT movable bridges
Glimmer Glass Bridge
Effects of Hurricane Sandy in New Jersey

References 

NJ Transit bridges
Point Pleasant Beach, New Jersey
Brielle, New Jersey
Bridges in Monmouth County, New Jersey
Bridges in Ocean County, New Jersey
Bridges completed in 1911
Railroad bridges in New Jersey
Central Railroad of New Jersey
Pennsylvania Railroad bridges
1911 establishments in New Jersey
Bascule bridges in the United States